Bryanston Square is an  garden square in Marylebone, London. Terraced buildings surround it — often merged, converted or sub-divided, some of which remain residential. The southern end has the William Pitt Byrne memorial fountain. Next to both ends are cycle parking spaces.

The most notable merged building is the Swiss Embassy at the north-east end. The square's narrow northern and southern ends are joined by broad approach streets of the same British Regency date. More recent style flanks the mid-west range of the square in the form of №s 31, 32 and 33 which are three times an ordinary range of its widths, meaning the numbering scheme today skips ten following numbers, destroyed to make room for these, to culminate with №s 44 to 50 and the highest-numbered buildings of Great Cumberland Place – its corner houses, №s  63 and 68.  That street, this square and Wyndham Place run broad and straight for 750 metres without building projections between an 1821-built church and Marble Arch, moved to its permanent site in 1851.

Traffic circulates clockwise around the square and numbering runs anti-clockwise.

Amenities and neighbours

Wyndham Place

The church is Grade I listed. Its №s 3 to 6 and 9 to 16 are alike light-brown brick terraces with white, ashlar-style stucco to the lower floors, by Parkinson, and completed by 1823, they are Grade II listed (this is the lowest and dominant of three categories).

Great Cumberland Place

Mid-way it broadens into a green crescent, Wallenberg Place, the arc of which is fronted by five buildings including Western Marble Arch Synagogue. The thoroughfare culminates with, across an approach to Oxford Street, Marble Arch aligned just off-centre before which, flanking, are: Cumberland Court and the Cumberland Hotel which incorporates the tube station and walkway to Hyde Park. Its predominant use classes are homes and hotels.

Architectural context and features
The square, taken at its greatest, is  the size of Portman Square. It has roads, broad pavements and a private tree-planted garden. Wetherby Preparatory School occupies part of the south west corner. Listed are:

the east side, №s 1 to 21 and so 1A
the north-west side, №s 25, 25A and 26
most of the west side:
№s 27, 27A, 28, 29, 30, 31, 32
№s 44 to 48
the south-west side, *№s 49, 50 and 63 Gt. Cumberland. Pl.
the south-east side, 68 Great Cumberland Place

The neat (geometric) façades contrast with fluctuations in colour and height. Slightly varied ochre brickwork from building to building (historically referred to as 'yellow bricks') is accompanied in by differing mansard roofs, mostly of grey slate. A little facing red-brown brick is used. Decorative black balconies above the first level are accompanied by a white chamfered band course at the penultimate level before the mansard. At the divide of the mansards or parapet roofs with roof gardens is a longer such course forming a more pronounced white band course (the main cornice). All of the casements are tall white, multi-pane sash windows of uniform height and distribution. The first-listed above was finished in 1811 to designs by Joseph Parkinson. The doric and ionic orders are used but symmetry is stressed. №s  10 to 12 and 19 to 21 were rebuilt to match, due to war damage.

In the south is the William Pitt Byrne Memorial Fountain, erected in 1862, a Grade II (initial category) listed monument under the statutory protection scheme, as is an ornamental water pump at the opposite end.

Ambassadorial presence
Swiss Embassy in London at 1A (terraces formerly known as №s 16 to 22).

History
Named after its founder Henry William Portman's home village of Bryanston (as lords of the manor) in Dorset, it was built as part of the family's estate between 1810 and 1815, along with Montagu Square beyond the nominally-associated eastern Mews.

Notable people
 George Shaw-Lefevre, 1st Baron Eversley (1831–1928) minister of state and co-founder of the Commons Preservation Society to protect among others Hampstead Heath and Epping Forest
Mustafa Reşid Pasha in 1839, at №1
 Osmond Barnes (1834–1930), Indian Army officer, was born at №7 on 23 December 1834. As Chief Herald of India he proclaimed Queen Victoria Empress of India at Delhi in 1877.
 Emma Elizabeth Thoyts (1860–1949) historian was born in a house on the square.
 Julia Duckworth (1846–1895, later Stephen) and her husband Herbert at №38, 1867–1870
 Abe Bailey (1864–1940) South African politician, businessman and sportsman, at №38. The talks which led to David Lloyd George succeeding H. H. Asquith as Prime Minister of the United Kingdom took place in Bailey's house in December 1916.
  H Lyndoch Gardiner (1820–1897) Queen's Equerry, at №31.
 Sir Reginald Hanson, 1st Baronet, one of the two Members of Parliament for The City of London - 1891 to 1900. Bryanston Square was the territorial designation of this baronetcy, extinct 1996.
 Allan Octavian Hume, Indian Civil Services, born at 6 Bryanston Square
 1st–3rd Lords Farrer, the first of whom was a senior civil servant statistician in the mid 19th century.
 Wallis Simpson, the future wife of Edward VIII lived at the square just before his abdication in December 1936.
 William Dodge James died at his home, №28.
 the son of FAF (still living somehow)

Tributes
The Bryanston suburb of Johannesburg, South Africa, is named after the square.

Notes

References

External links 
 LondonTown.com information

Squares in the City of Westminster
Portman estate
Marylebone
Communal gardens
Garden squares in London